Wuzi Xueyuan Lu is a station on Line 6 of the Beijing Subway. The construction of this station began on September 20, 2012, and was completed in 2014.  This station is the first in Tongzhou District, Beijing when travelling eastbound towards .

Station Layout 
The station has an underground island platform.

Exits 
There are 3 exits, lettered A, B, and D. Exits A and D are accessible.

References

Beijing Subway stations in Tongzhou District
Railway stations in China opened in 2014